The  Colorado Rockies entered the season attempting to improve on their 74–88 record from 2008. They lost 28 of their first 46 games, but following the hiring of interim manager Jim Tracy, the Rockies came back to win their third Wild Card title, and second in three years. The team drew 2,665,080 fans for the season, their highest total since 2002.  The average home attendance was 32,902 fans. Their 92 regular season wins is currently the most in a single season in Rockies franchise history.

Offseason
 November 10, 2008: Matt Holliday was traded by the Colorado Rockies to the Oakland Athletics for Carlos González, Huston Street, and Greg Smith.
 January 6, 2009: Luis Vizcaíno was traded by the Colorado Rockies to the Chicago Cubs for Jason Marquis.
 February 1, 2009: Matt Belisle was signed as a free agent by the Colorado Rockies.
 April 5, 2009: Jason Hammel was traded by the Tampa Bay Rays to the Colorado Rockies for Aneury Rodríguez.

Regular season

Season standings

Wild Card standings

Record vs. opponents

Transactions
 July 23, 2009: Rafael Betancourt was traded by the Cleveland Indians to the Colorado Rockies for Connor Graham (minors).
 July 31, 2009: Joe Beimel was traded by the Washington Nationals to the Colorado Rockies for Ryan Mattheus and Robinson Fabian (minors).
 August 24, 2009: Jason Giambi was signed as a free agent by the Colorado Rockies.
 August 31, 2009: José Contreras was traded by the Chicago White Sox to the Colorado Rockies for Brandon Hynick (minors).

Major League debuts
 Batters:
 Eric Young, Jr. (Aug 25)
 Mike McCoy (Sep 9)
 Pitchers:
 Matt Daley (Apr 25)
 Jhoulys Chacín (Jul 25)
 Esmil Rogers (Sep 12)

Roster

Game log 

|-  style="text-align:center; background:#fbb;"
| 1 || April 6 || @ Diamondbacks || 9–8 || Peña (1–0) || Grilli (0–1) || Qualls (1) || 48,799 || 0–1
|-  style="text-align:center; background:#bfb;"
| 2 || April 7 || @ Diamondbacks || 3–0 || Jiménez (1–0) || Haren (0–1) || Street (1) || 26,637 || 1–1
|-  style="text-align:center; background:#bfb;"
| 3 || April 8 || @ Diamondbacks || 9–2 || Morales (1–0) || Davis (0–1) || || 18,227 || 2–1
|-  style="text-align:center; background:#bfb;"
| 4 || April 10 || Phillies || 10–3 || Marquis (1–0) || Hamels (0–1) || || 49,427 || 3–1
|-  style="text-align:center; background:#fbb;"
| 5 || April 11 || Phillies || 8–4 || Myers (1–1) || de la Rosa (0–1) || || 35,251 || 3–2
|-  style="text-align:center; background:#fbb;"
| 6 || April 12 || Phillies || 7–5 || Madson (1–0) || Street (0–1) || Lidge (2) || 21,628 || 3–3
|-  style="text-align:center; background:#fbb;"
| 7 || April 13 || @ Cubs || 4–0 || Lilly (2–0) || Jiménez (1–1) || || 40,077 || 3–4
|-  style="text-align:center; background:#bfb;"
| 8 || April 15 || @ Cubs || 5–2 || Marquis (2–0) || Harden (0–1) || Grilli (1) || 39,361 || 4–4
|-  style="text-align:center; background:#fbb;"
| 9 || April 17 || @ Dodgers || 4–3 || Mota (1–0) || Embree (0–1) || Broxton (4) || 45,145 || 4–5
|-  style="text-align:center; background:#fbb;"
| 10 || April 18 || @ Dodgers || 9–5 || Billingsley (3–0) || Cook (0–1) || || 36,765 || 4–6
|-  style="text-align:center; background:#fbb;"
| 11 || April 19 || @ Dodgers || 14–2 || Elbert (1–0) || Jiménez (1–2) || || 41,474 || 4–7
|-  style="text-align:center; background:#fbb;"
| 12 || April 20 || @ Diamondbacks || 6–3 || Garland (2–1) || Marquis (2–1) || Qualls (3) || 25,788 || 4–8
|-  style="text-align:center; background:#bfb;"
| 13 || April 21 || @ Diamondbacks || 9–6 || Belisle (1–0) || Gutiérrez (0–1) || Corpas (1) || 25,411 || 5–8
|-  style="text-align:center; background:#fbb;"
| 14 || April 22 || @ Diamondbacks || 2–0 || Haren (1–3) || de la Rosa (0–2) || Qualls (4) || 19,147 || 5–9
|-  style="text-align:center; background:#fbb;"
| 15 || April 24 || Dodgers || 6–5 || Kuo (1–0) || Corpas (0–1) || Broxton (6) || 36,151 || 5–10
|-  style="text-align:center; background:#fbb;"
| 16 || April 25 || Dodgers || 6–5 || McDonald (1–1) || Jiménez (1–3) || Troncoso (1) || 31,476 || 5–11
|-  style="text-align:center; background:#bfb;"
| 17 || April 26 || Dodgers || 10–4 || Marquis (3–1) || Kershaw (0–2) || || 35,505 || 6–11
|-  style="text-align:center; background:#bfb;"
| 18 || April 27 || Padres || 12–7 || Grilli (1–1) || Young (2–1) || || 18,246 || 7–11
|-  style="text-align:center; background:#fbb;"
| 19 || April 28 || Padres || 4–3 || Sánchez (1–0) || Corpas (0–2) || Bell (8) || 19,346 || 7–12
|-  style="text-align:center; background:#bfb;"
| 20 || April 29 || Padres || 7–5 || Cook (1–1) || Correia (0–2) || Street (2) || 20,289 || 8–12
|-

|-  style="text-align:center; background:#fbb;"
| 21 || May 1 || @ Giants || 3–2 || Johnson (2–2) || Jiménez (1–4) || Wilson (6) || 30,791 || 8–13
|-  style="text-align:center; background:#bfb;"
| 22 || May 2 || @ Giants || 5–1 || Marquis (4–1) || Cain (2–1) || || 30,166 || 9–13
|-  style="text-align:center; background:#fbb;"
| 23 || May 3 || @ Giants || 1–0 (10) || Medders (1–1) || Corpas (0–3) || || 30,650 || 9–14
|-  style="text-align:center; background:#bfb;"
| 24 || May 4 || @ Padres || 9–6 || Rusch (1–0) || Moreno (1–3) || Street (3) || 14,717 || 10–14
|-  style="text-align:center; background:#fbb;"
| 25 || May 5 || @ Padres || 2–1 (10) || Bell (1–0) || Daley (0–1) || || 13,646 || 10–15
|-  style="text-align:center; background:#bfb;"
| 26 || May 6 || Giants || 11–1 || Jiménez (2–4) || Johnson (2–3) || || 22,105 || 11–15
|-  style="text-align:center; background:#fbb;"
| 27 || May 7 || Giants || 8–3 || Cain (3–1) || Marquis (4–2) || || 23,453 || 11–16
|-  style="text-align:center; background:#fbb;"
| 28 || May 8 || Marlins || 8–3 || Nolasco (2–3) || Hammel (0–1) || || 27,398 || 11–17
|-  style="text-align:center; background:#fbb;"
| 29 || May 9 || Marlins || 3–1 || Johnson (3–0) || de la Rosa (0–3) || Lindstrom (6) || 28,227 || 11–18
|-  style="text-align:center; background:#bfb;"
| 30 || May 10 || Marlins || 3–2 || Cook (2–1) || Volstad (2–2) || Street (4) || 30,197 || 12–18
|-  style="text-align:center; background:#bfb;"
| 31 || May 12 || Astros || 12–1 || Jiménez (3–4) || Paulino (0–3) || || 23,233 || 13–18
|-  style="text-align:center; background:#fbb;"
| 32 || May 13 || Astros || 15–11 || Hampton (2–3) || Marquis (4–3) || || 19,226 || 13–19
|-  style="text-align:center; background:#fbb;"
| 33 || May 14 || Astros || 5–3 || Rodríguez (4–2) || Hammel (0–2) || Hawkins (5) || 22,696 || 13–20
|-  style="text-align:center; background:#bfb;"
| 34 || May 15 || @ Pirates || 3–1 || Embree (1–1) || Capps (0–3) || Street (5) || 17,179 || 14–20
|-  style="text-align:center; background:#fbb;"
| 35 || May 16 || @ Pirates || 7–4 || Burnett (1–1) || Belisle (1–1) || Capps (7) || 24,496 || 14–21
|-  style="text-align:center; background:#fbb;"
| 36 || May 17 || @ Pirates || 11–4 || Duke (5–3) || Embree (1–2) || || 14,545 || 14–22
|-  style="text-align:center; background:#bfb;"
| 37 || May 18 || @ Braves || 5–1 || Marquis (5–3) || Lowe (5–2) || || 15,364 || 15–22
|-  style="text-align:center; background:#fbb;"
| 38 || May 19 || @ Braves || 8–1 || Jurrjens (4–2) || Hammel (0–3) || || 16,749 || 15–23
|-  style="text-align:center; background:#fbb;"
| 39 || May 20 || @ Braves || 12–4 || Vázquez (4–3) || de la Rosa (0–4) || || 19,259 || 15–24
|-  style="text-align:center; background:#bfb;"
| 40 || May 21 || @ Braves || 9–0 || Cook (3–1) || Medlen (0–1) || || 25,481 || 16–24
|-  style="text-align:center; background:#fbb;"
| 41 || May 22 || @ Tigers || 4–3 || Porcello (5–3) || Jiménez (3–5) || Zumaya (1) || 28,264 || 16–25
|-  style="text-align:center; background:#bfb;"
| 42 || May 23 || @ Tigers || 4–3 || Marquis (6–3) || Galarraga (3–4) || Street (6) || 37,035 || 17–25
|-  style="text-align:center; background:#bfb;"
| 43 || May 24 || @ Tigers || 3–1 || Hammel (1–3) || Willis (1–1) || Street (7) || 34,606 || 18–25
|-  style="text-align:center; background:#fbb;"
| 44 || May 25 || Dodgers || 16–6 || Ohman (1–0) || de la Rosa (0–5) || || 37,024 || 18–26
|-  style="text-align:center; background:#fbb;"
| 45 || May 26 || Dodgers || 7–1 || Milton (1–0) || Cook (3–2) || || 25,384 || 18–27
|-  style="text-align:center; background:#fbb;"
| 46 || May 27 || Dodgers || 8–6 || Kershaw (3–3) || Jiménez (3–6) || || 22,271 || 18–28
|-  style="text-align:center; background:#bfb;"
| 47 || May 29 || Padres || 3–0 || Marquis (7–3) || Young (4–3) || Street (8) || 23,239 || 19–28
|-  style="text-align:center; background:#bfb;"
| 48 || May 30 || Padres || 8–7 || Street (1–1) || Bell (2–1) || || 32,064 || 20–28
|-  style="text-align:center; background:#fbb;"
| 49 || May 31 || Padres || 5–2 || Gaudin (2–3) || de la Rosa (0–6) || Bell (15) || 30,223 || 20–29
|-

|-  style="text-align:center; background:#fbb;"
| 50 || June 1 || @ Astros || 4–1 || Oswalt (2–2) || Cook (3–3) || Hawkins (7) || 24,016 || 20–30
|-  style="text-align:center; background:#fbb;"
| 51 || June 2 || @ Astros || 3–2 (11) || Ortiz (3–2) || Fogg (0–1) || || 24,041 || 20–31
|-  style="text-align:center; background:#fbb;"
| 52 || June 3 || @ Astros || 6–4 || Byrdak (2–1) || Marquis (7–4) || Sampson (3) || 22,032 || 20–32
|-  style="text-align:center; background:#bfb;"
| 53 || June 4 || @ Astros || 10–3 || Hammel (2–3) || Rodríguez (5–5) || || 26,671 || 21–32
|-  style="text-align:center; background:#bfb;"
| 54 || June 5 || @ Cardinals || 11–4 || de la Rosa (1–6) || Wainwright (5–4) || || 41,115 || 22–32
|-  style="text-align:center; background:#bfb;"
| 55 || June 6 || @ Cardinals || 10–1 || Cook (4–3) || Wellemeyer (5–6) || || 44,002 || 23–32
|-  style="text-align:center; background:#bfb;"
| 56 || June 7 || @ Cardinals || 7–2 || Jiménez (4–6) || Piñeiro (5–6) || || 42,288 || 24–32
|-  style="text-align:center; background:#bfb;"
| 57 || June 8 || @ Cardinals || 5–2 || Marquis (8–4) || Thompson (0–2) || Street (9) || 36,748 || 25–32
|-  style="text-align:center; background:#bfb;"
| 58 || June 9 || @ Brewers || 3–2 || Hammel (3–3) || Coffey (1–1) || Street (10) || 32,464 || 26–32
|-  style="text-align:center; background:#bfb;"
| 59 || June 10 || @ Brewers || 4–2 || de la Rosa (2–6) || Bush (3–3) || Street (11) || 34,823 || 27–32
|-  style="text-align:center; background:#bfb;"
| 60 || June 11 || @ Brewers || 5–4 || Cook (5–3) || Gallardo (6–3) || Street (12) || 35,467 || 28–32
|-  style="text-align:center; background:#bfb;"
| 61 || June 12 || Mariners || 6–4 || Jiménez (5–6) || Washburn (3–5) || || 30,365 || 29–32
|-  style="text-align:center; background:#bfb;"
| 62 || June 13 || Mariners || 5–3 || Corpas (1–3) || Lowe (0–4) || Street (13) || 31,101 || 30–32
|-  style="text-align:center; background:#bfb;"
| 63 || June 14 || Mariners || 7–1 || Hammel (4–3) || Vargas (2–2) || || 38,614 || 31–32
|-  style="text-align:center; background:#fbb;"
| 64 || June 16 || Rays || 12–4 || Niemann (6–4) || de la Rosa (2–7) || || 28,582 || 31–33
|-  style="text-align:center; background:#bfb;"
| 65 || June 17 || Rays || 5–3 || Cook (6–3) || Price (1–1) || Street (14) || 26,460 || 32–33
|-  style="text-align:center; background:#bfb;"
| 66 || June 18 || Rays || 4–3  || Jiménez (6–6)  || Garza (4–5) || Street (15) || 28,639 || 33–33
|-  style="text-align:center; background:#bfb;"
| 67 || June 19 || Pirates || 7–3  || Marquis (9–4)  || Ohlendorf (6–6) || || 31,248 || 34–33
|-  style="text-align:center; background:#bfb;"
| 68 || June 20 || Pirates || 9–7  || Street (2–1) || Chavez (0–3)  || || 32,137  || 35–33
|-  style="text-align:center; background:#bfb;"
| 69 || June 21 || Pirates || 5–4 || de la Rosa (3–7) || Maholm (4–4) || Street (16) || 44,131 || 36–33
|-  style="text-align:center; background:#bfb;"
| 70 || June 22 || @ Angels || 11–1 || Cook (7–3) || Palmer (6–1) || || 39,557 || 37–33
|-  style="text-align:center; background:#fbb;"
| 71 || June 23 || @ Angels || 4–3 || Jepsen (2–2) || Jiménez (6–7) || Fuentes (20) || 42,233 || 37–34
|-  style="text-align:center; background:#fbb;"
| 72 || June 24 || @ Angels || 11–3 || Saunders (8–4) || Marquis (9–5) || || 43,551 || 37–35
|-  style="text-align:center; background:#bfb;"
| 73 || June 26 || @ Athletics || 4–2 || Hammel (5–3) || Braden (5–7) || Street (17) || 20,872 || 38–35
|-  style="text-align:center; background:#bfb;"
| 74 || June 27 || @ Athletics || 11–9 || de la Rosa (4–7) || Cahill (5–6) || Street (18) || 18,624 || 39–35
|-  style="text-align:center; background:#bfb;"
| 75 || June 28 || @ Athletics || 3–1 || Cook (8–3) || Mazzaro (2–3) || Street (19) || 15,701 || 40–35
|-  style="text-align:center; background:#fbb;"
| 76 || June 29 || @ Dodgers || 4–2 (13) || McDonald (2–1) || Peralta (0–1) || || 41,288 || 40–36
|-  style="text-align:center; background:#bfb;"
| 77 || June 30 || @ Dodgers || 3–0 || Marquis (10–5) || Billingsley (9–4) || || 43,437 || 41–36
|-

|-  style="text-align:center; background:#fbb;"
| 78 || July 1 || @ Dodgers || 1–0 || Troncoso (2–0) || Hammel (5–4) || Broxton (19) || 40,455 || 41–37
|-  style="text-align:center; background:#bfb;"
| 79 || July 3 || Diamondbacks || 5–0 || de la Rosa (5–7) || Scherzer (5–6) || || 49,026 || 42–37
|-  style="text-align:center; background:#fbb;"
| 80 || July 4 || Diamondbacks || 11–7 || Schoeneweis (1–0) || Peralta (0–2) || Qualls (14) || 49,096 || 42–38
|-  style="text-align:center; background:#fbb;"
| 81 || July 5 || Diamondbacks || 4–3 || Haren (8–5) || Jiménez (6–8) || Qualls (15) || 27,547 || 42–39
|-  style="text-align:center; background:#bfb;"
| 82 || July 6 || Nationals || 1–0 || Marquis (11–5) || Stammen (1–4) || Street (20) || 25,205 || 43–39
|-  style="text-align:center; background:#bfb;"
| 83 || July 7 || Nationals || 5–4 || Embree (2–2) || Tavárez (3–7) || Street (21) || 25,314 || 44–39
|-  style="text-align:center; background:#bfb;"
| 84 || July 8 || Nationals || 10–4 || de la Rosa (6–7) || Detwiler (0–5) ||  || 23,098 || 45–39
|-  style="text-align:center; background:#bfb;"
| 85 || July 9 || Braves || 7–6 || Rincón (2–0) || González (3–2) || Street (22) || 30,392 || 46–39
|-  style="text-align:center; background:#fbb;"
| 86 || July 10 || Braves || 4–1 || Lowe (8–7) || Jiménez (6–9) || Soriano (11) || 35,238 || 46–40
|-  style="text-align:center; background:#fbb;"
| 87 || July 11 || Braves || 4–3 || Jurrjens (7–7) || Marquis (11–6) || Soriano (12) || 38,065 || 46–41
|-  style="text-align:center; background:#bfb;"
| 88 || July 12 || Braves || 8–7 || Street (3–1) || Valdez (0–1) || || 33,825 || 47–41
|-  style="text-align:center; background:#bfb;"
| 89 || July 16 || @ Padres || 10–1 || Cook (9–3) || Gaudin (4–8) ||  || 22,758 || 48–41
|-  style="text-align:center; background:#bfb;"
| 90 || July 17 || @ Padres || 5–3 || Jiménez (7–9) || Geer (1–5) || Street (23) || 21,887 || 49–41
|-  style="text-align:center; background:#fbb;"
| 91 || July 18 || @ Padres || 3–1 || Burke (2–1) || Peralta (0–3) || Bell (24) || 28,652 || 49–42
|-  style="text-align:center; background:#bfb;"
| 92 || July 19 || @ Padres || 6–1 || Marquis (12–6) || Latos (0–1) || || 20,747 || 50–42
|-  style="text-align:center; background:#bfb;"
| 93 || July 20 || Diamondbacks || 10–6 || de la Rosa (7–7) || Davis (4–10) || || 40,444 || 51–42
|-  style="text-align:center; background:#fbb;"
| 94 || July 21 || Diamondbacks || 6–5 || Gutiérrez (2–2) || Rincón (2–1) || Qualls (18) || 30,248 || 51–43
|-  style="text-align:center; background:#bfb;"
| 95 || July 22 || Diamondbacks || 4–3 || Rincón (3–1) || Schoeneweis (1–2) || Street (24) || 30,451 || 52–43
|-  style="text-align:center; background:#fbb;"
| 96 || July 24 || Giants || 3–1 || Cain (12–2) || Hammel (5–5) || Wilson (25) || 40,524 || 52–44
|-  style="text-align:center; background:#bfb;"
| 97 || July 25 || Giants || 8–2 || de la Rosa (8–7) || Sánchez (3–9) || || 42,201 || 53–44
|-  style="text-align:center; background:#bfb;"
| 98 || July 26 || Giants || 4–2 || Cook (10–3) || Sadowski (2–3) || Street (25) || 40,723 || 54–44
|-  style="text-align:center; background:#fbb;"
| 99 || July 27 || @ Mets || 7–3 || Feliciano (3–3) || Rincón (3–2) || || 38,936 || 54–45
|-  style="text-align:center; background:#fbb;"
| 100 || July 28 || @ Mets || 4–0 || Pelfrey (8–6) || Marquis (12–7) || || 39,126 || 54–46
|-  style="text-align:center; background:#bbb;"
| – || July 29 || @ Mets || colspan=6 | Postponed (rain) Rescheduled for July 30
|-  style="text-align:center; background:#fbb;"
| 101 || July 30 || @ Mets || 7–0 || Santana (12–8) || Hammel (5–6) || || 40,024 || 54–47
|-  style="text-align:center; background:#bfb;"
| 102 || July 30 || @ Mets || 4–2 || de la Rosa (9–7) || Niese (1–1) || Street (26) || 38,962 || 55–47
|-  style="text-align:center; background:#bfb;"
| 103 || July 31 || @ Reds || 5–3 || Morales (2–0) || Weathers (2–3) || Street (27) || 22,130 || 56–47
|-

|-  style="text-align:center; background:#bfb;"
| 104 || August 1 || @ Reds || 6–2 || Jiménez (8–9) || Bailey (2–3) || || 23,452 || 57–47
|-  style="text-align:center; background:#bfb;"
| 105 || August 2 || @ Reds || 6–4 (11) || Morales (3–0) || Masset (4–1) || Street (28) || 31,142 || 58–47
|-  style="text-align:center; background:#bfb;"
| 106 || August 4 || @ Phillies || 8–3 || Hammel (6–6) || Moyer (10–8) || || 45,203 || 59–47
|-  style="text-align:center; background:#fbb;"
| 107 || August 5 || @ Phillies || 7–0 || Happ (8–2) || de la Rosa (9–8) || || 45,129 || 59–48
|-  style="text-align:center; background:#fbb;"
| 108 || August 6 || @ Phillies || 3–1 || Lee (9–9) || Cook (10–4) || Lidge (21) || 45,316 || 59–49
|-  style="text-align:center; background:#bfb;"
| 109 || August 7 || Cubs || 6–2 || Jiménez (9–9) || Marshall (3–7) || || 46,118 || 60–49
|-  style="text-align:center; background:#fbb;"
| 110 || August 8 || Cubs || 6–5 || Dempster (6–5) || Marquis (12–8) || Gregg (22) || 47,845 || 60–50
|-  style="text-align:center; background:#bfb;"
| 111 || August 9 || Cubs || 11–5 || Hammel (7–6) || Wells (8–5) || || 40,217 || 61–50
|-  style="text-align:center; background:#bfb;"
| 112 || August 10 || Cubs || 11–5 || de la Rosa (10–8) || Gorzelanny (4–2) || || 34,485 || 62–50
|-  style="text-align:center; background:#fbb;"
| 113 || August 11 || Pirates || 7–3 || Ohlendorf (10–8) || Chacín (0–1) || || 35,212 || 62–51
|-  style="text-align:center; background:#bfb;"
| 114 || August 12 || Pirates || 8–0 || Jiménez (10–9) || Hart (3–2) || || 29,430 || 63–51
|-  style="text-align:center; background:#bfb;"
| 115 || August 13 || Pirates || 10–1 || Marquis (13–8) || Maholm (6–7) || || 27,619 || 64–51
|-  style="text-align:center; background:#fbb;"
| 116 || August 14 || @ Marlins || 6–5 || Johnson (12–2) || Hammel (7–7) || Núñez (13) || 15,965 || 64–52
|-  style="text-align:center; background:#bbb;"
| – || August 15 || @ Marlins || colspan=6 | Postponed (rain) Rescheduled for August 16
|-  style="text-align:center; background:#fbb;"
| 117 || August 16 || @ Marlins || 10–3 || Volstad (9–9) || Cook (10–5) || || 18,471 || 64–53
|-  style="text-align:center; background:#bfb;"
| 118 || August 16 || @ Marlins || 7–3 || de la Rosa (11–8) || VandenHurk (2–2) || Street (29) || 20,089 || 65–53
|-  style="text-align:center; background:#bfb;"
| 119 || August 18 || @ Nationals || 4–3 || Jiménez (11–9) || Burnett (2–3) || Street (30) || 18,192 || 66–53
|-  style="text-align:center; background:#bfb;"
| 120 || August 19 || @ Nationals || 5–4 || Marquis (14–8) || Balester (1–3) || Street (31) || 16,187 || 67–53
|-  style="text-align:center; background:#bfb;"
| 121 || August 20 || @ Nationals || 4–1 || Hammel (8–7) || Mock (2–5) || Street (32) || 18,036 || 68–53
|-  style="text-align:center; background:#fbb;"
| 122 || August 21 || Giants || 6–3 || Sánchez (6–10) || Cook (10–6) || || 43,666 || 68–54
|-  style="text-align:center; background:#bfb;"
| 123 || August 22 || Giants || 14–11 || de la Rosa (12–8) || Miller (2–2) || || 47,178 || 69–54
|-  style="text-align:center; background:#bfb;"
| 124 || August 23 || Giants || 4–2 || Jiménez (12–9) || Lincecum (12–4) || Street (33) || 48,704 || 70–54
|-  style="text-align:center; background:#bfb;"
| 125 || August 24 || Giants || 6–4 (14) || Eaton (3–5) || Miller (2–3) || || 27,670 || 71–54
|-  style="text-align:center; background:#bfb;"
| 126 || August 25 || Dodgers || 5–4 (10) || Herges (3–1) || McDonald (3–3) || || 31,472 || 72–54
|-  style="text-align:center; background:#fbb;"
| 127 || August 26 || Dodgers || 6–1 || Wolf (9–6) || Fogg (0–2) || || 38,350 || 72–55
|-  style="text-align:center; background:#fbb;"
| 128 || August 27 || Dodgers || 3–2 || Padilla (9–6) || de la Rosa (12–9) || Broxton (28) || 33,441 || 72–56
|-  style="text-align:center; background:#fbb;"
| 129 || August 28 || @ Giants || 2–0 || Lincecum (13–4) || Jiménez (12–10) || Wilson (31) || 39,047 || 72–57
|-  style="text-align:center; background:#fbb;"
| 130 || August 29 || @ Giants || 5–3 || Zito (9–11) || Marquis (14–9) || Wilson (32) || 41,200 || 72–58
|-  style="text-align:center; background:#fbb;"
| 131 || August 30 || @ Giants || 9–5 || Medders (3–1) || Betancourt (1–3) || || 42,571 || 72–59
|-

|-  style="text-align:center; background:#bfb;"
| 132 || September 1 || Mets || 8–3 || de la Rosa (13–9) || Pelfrey (9–10) || || 26,190 || 73–59
|-  style="text-align:center; background:#bfb;"
| 133 || September 2 || Mets || 5–2 || Jiménez (13–10) || Stokes (1–4) || Morales (1) || 26,276 || 74–59
|-  style="text-align:center; background:#fbb;"
| 134 || September 3 || Mets || 8–3 || Misch (1–1) || Marquis (14–10) || || 22,566 || 74–60
|-  style="text-align:center; background:#bfb;"
| 135 || September 4 || Diamondbacks || 5–4 || Betancourt (2–3) || Boyer (0–2) || Morales (2) || 31,401 || 75–60
|-  style="text-align:center; background:#bfb;"
| 136 || September 5 || Diamondbacks || 4–1 || Contreras (6–13) || Davis (7–12) || Morales (3) || 39,297 || 76–60
|-  style="text-align:center; background:#bfb;"
| 137 || September 6 || Diamondbacks || 13–5 || de la Rosa (14–9) || Petit (3–9) || || 35,192 || 77–60
|-  style="text-align:center; background:#bfb;"
| 138 || September 7 || Reds || 4–3 || Betancourt (3–3) || Fisher (1–1) || Morales (4) || 40,357 || 78–60
|-  style="text-align:center; background:#bfb;"
| 139 || September 8 || Reds || 3–1 || Marquis (15–10) || Maloney (0–4) || Morales (5) || 23,154 || 79–60
|-  style="text-align:center; background:#bfb;"
| 140 || September 9 || Reds || 4–3 || Daley (1–1) || Cordero (2–5) || || 23,721 || 80–60
|-  style="text-align:center; background:#bfb;"
| 141 || September 10 || Reds || 5–1 || Rincón (4–2) || Wells (1–4) || || 24,175 || 81–60
|-  style="text-align:center; background:#bfb;"
| 142 || September 11 || @ Padres || 4–1 || Betancourt (4–3) || Bell (5–3) || Morales (6) || 18,022 || 82–60
|-  style="text-align:center; background:#fbb;"
| 143 || September 12 || @ Padres || 3–2 (10) || Gallagher (2–2) || Morales (3–1) || || 19,897 || 82–61
|-  style="text-align:center; background:#fbb;"
| 144 || September 13 || @ Padres || 7–3 || Russell (2–0) || Marquis (15–11) || || 19,739 || 82–62
|-  style="text-align:center; background:#fbb;"
| 145 || September 14 || @ Giants || 9–1 || Lincecum (14–5) || Hammel (8–8) || || 31,307 || 82–63
|-  style="text-align:center; background:#fbb;"
| 146 || September 15 || @ Giants || 10–2 || Zito (10–12) || Jiménez (13–11) || || 30,353 || 82–64
|-  style="text-align:center; background:#bfb;"
| 147 || September 16 || @ Giants || 4–3 || de la Rosa (15–9) || Cain (13–6) || Betancourt (2) || 38,696 || 83–64
|-  style="text-align:center; background:#fbb;"
| 148 || September 18 || @ Diamondbacks || 7–5 || Rosales (2–1) || Flores (0–1) || Gutiérrez (6) || 34,231 || 83–65
|-  style="text-align:center; background:#bfb;"
| 149 || September 19 || @ Diamondbacks || 10–4 || Hammel (9–8) || Scherzer (9–10) || || 29,466 || 84–65
|-  style="text-align:center; background:#bfb;"
| 150 || September 20 || @ Diamondbacks || 5–1 || Jiménez (14–11) || Haren (14–9) || || 29,397 || 85–65
|-  style="text-align:center; background:#bfb;"
| 151 || September 22 || Padres || 11–10 || Belisle (2–1) || Ramos (0–1) || Morales (7) || 30,695 || 86–65
|-  style="text-align:center; background:#fbb;"
| 152 || September 23 || Padres || 6–3 || Webb (1–0) || Marquis (15–12) || Bell (40) || 29,597 || 86–66
|-  style="text-align:center; background:#fbb;"
| 153 || September 24 || Padres || 5–4 || Russell (3–1) || Beimel (1–6) || Gregerson (1) || 37,049 || 86–67
|-  style="text-align:center; background:#bfb;"
| 154 || September 25 || Cardinals || 2–1 || Street (4–1) || Miller (4–1) || || 48,847 || 87–67
|-  style="text-align:center; background:#fbb;"
| 155 || September 26 || Cardinals || 6–3 || Wainwright (19–8) || Jiménez (14–12) || Franklin (38) || 47,741 || 87–68
|-  style="text-align:center; background:#bfb;"
| 156 || September 27 || Cardinals || 4–3 || de la Rosa (16–9) || Lohse (6–9) || Street (34) || 42,032 || 88–68
|-  style="text-align:center; background:#bfb;"
| 157 || September 29 || Brewers || 7–5 (11) || Belisle (3–1) || Weathers (4–6) || || 39,087 || 89–68
|-  style="text-align:center; background:#bfb;"
| 158 || September 30 || Brewers || 10–6 || Hammel (10–8) || Suppan (7–12) || || 41,465 || 90–68
|-

|-  style="text-align:center; background:#bfb;"
| 159 || October 1 || Brewers || 9–2 || Cook (11–6) || Parra (11–11) || || 38,098 || 91–68
|-  style="text-align:center; background:#bfb;"
| 160 || October 2 || @ Dodgers || 4–3 || Jiménez (15–12) || Wolf (11–7) || Street (35) || 54,131 || 92–68
|-  style="text-align:center; background:#fbb;"
| 161 || October 3 || @ Dodgers || 5–0 || Kuo (2–0) || Morales (3–2) || || 54,531 || 92–69
|-  style="text-align:center; background:#fbb;"
| 162 || October 4 || @ Dodgers || 5–3 || Padilla (12–6) || Marquis (15–13) || Troncoso (6) || 51,396 || 92–70
|-

Postseason

|-  style="text-align:center; background:#fbb;"
| 1 || October 7 || @ Phillies || 5–1 || Lee (1–0) || Jiménez (0–1) || || 46,452 || 0–1
|-  style="text-align:center; background:#bfb;"
| 2 || October 8 || @ Phillies || 5–4 || Cook (1–0) || Hamels (0–1) ||  Street (1) || 46,528 || 1–1
|-  style="text-align:center; background:#bbb;"
| – || October 10 || Phillies || colspan=6 | Postponed (snow/cold) Rescheduled for October 11
|-  style="text-align:center; background:#fbb;"
| 3 || October 11 || Phillies || 6–5 || Durbin (1–0) || Street (0–1) ||  Lidge (1) || 50,109 || 1–2
|-  style="text-align:center; background:#fbb;"
| 4 || October 12 || Phillies || 5–4 || Madson (1–0) || Street (0–2) ||  Lidge (2) || 49,940 || 1–3
|-

Player stats

Batting

Starters by position 
Note: Pos = Position; G = Games played; AB = At bats; H = Hits; Avg. = Batting average; HR = Home runs; RBI = Runs batted in

Other batters 
Note: G = Games played; AB = At bats; H = Hits; Avg. = Batting average; HR = Home runs; RBI = Runs batted in

Pitching

Starting pitchers 
Note: G = Games pitched; IP = Innings pitched; W = Wins; L = Losses; ERA = Earned run average; SO = Strikeouts

Other pitchers 
Note: G = Games pitched; IP = Innings pitched; W = Wins; L = Losses; ERA = Earned run average; SO = Strikeouts

Relief pitchers 
Note: G = Games pitched; W = Wins; L = Losses; SV = Saves; ERA = Earned run average; SO = Strikeouts

Notes
 Manager Clint Hurdle was fired and replaced by bench coach Jim Tracy taking the team from the NL West cellar to Wild Card contention winning 20 of the next 25 games 
 In June tied the team record 11-game winning streak set in 2007
 First ever team walk-off grand slam by Ryan Spilborghs to beat the Giants 6–4 in the 14th inning.
 Only team in the 2009 season to have five starting pitchers with 10 or more wins (Jason Marquis, Aaron Cook, Ubaldo Jiménez, Jorge de la Rosa, Jason Hammel).

Farm system

Source:

References

External links
 2009 Colorado Rockies season at Baseball-Reference.com
 2009 Colorado Rockies Schedule and Statistics at MLB.com

Colorado Rockies seasons
Colorado Rockies
Colorado Rockies
2000s in Denver